Soft Toilet Seats is a 1999 comedy film written and directed by Tina Valinsky and starring David Rosen, Alexa Jago and Jonathan Aube. It first had a limited release in the United States on December 3, 1999, before commercially releasing on March 10, 2000.

Plot
Pharmacist Arne Steinberg (David Rosen) is tricked into purchasing a mansion in the city from his best mate, only to learn that the previous owner (Sammi Davis) was either killed or committed suicide. Tilly Rensley, former roommate of hers (Alexa Jago) helps Arne unravel the mystery.

Cast
 David Rosen as Arne Steinberg (as David Alex Rosen)
 Alexa Jago as Tilly Rensley
 Jonathan Aube as Joey Carpini
 Sammi Davis as Annie Ashland
 Michael Greene as Detective Colson
 Margaret Blye as Margaret Lennox

References

External links
 
 
 

1999 films
1999 comedy films
American comedy films
1990s English-language films
1990s American films